Cytherea refer to:
	
 Cytherea, or Aphrodite, a goddess in Greek mythology

Arts and entertainment
 Cytherea (actress) (born 1981), an American pornographic film actress
 Cytherea (film), a 1924 lost silent film based on the Joseph Hergesheimer novel
 Cytherea, Goddess of Love, a 1922 novel by Joseph Hergesheimer

Biology

 Cytherea (fly), a genus of bee flies (Bombyliidae)
 Cytherea chione, or Callista chione, the smooth clam
 Cytherea multistriata, or Notocallista multistriata, a marine bivalve mollusc
 Acropora cytherea, a species of coral
 Cytherea, a synonym for the orchid genus Calypso

See also 
 Cythera (disambiguation)
 "Cytherean", a term referring to Cythera or Venus